BayLink is a long proposed transit connection between Miami and Miami Beach, Florida. Proposals have ranged from streetcar, light rail, monorail, Metromover, or Metrorail extension that would connect Downtown Miami to South Beach via the MacArthur Causeway, with the light rail or streetcar options potentially having loops at both ends. In 2020 the project was approved by commissioners as Miami Beach Monorail, a $770 million public private partnership project (costing $1.8 billion over 30 years to the public) connecting 5th Street in South Beach to Metromover on the mainland at the Genting property in Omni.

History
Originally proposed as an elevated light rail line such as a monorail, Miami Beach city officials opposed this in favor of something less intrusive, such as a streetcar. Historically, Miami Beach has also cited concerns of unwanted downtown residents as a detriment to the South Beach image. Additionally, the unused parts of the bases of the MacArthur Causeway bridge pilings that were to be used to support the line have been used for the widening of the causeway for the construction of the Port Miami Tunnel, complicating a fully separated right of way. Officials still thought it was feasible as a light rail streetcar, and in 2014 were considering the possibility of a public-private partnership to help fund it. In 2015, the cities of Miami and Miami Beach decided to break the estimated $532 million system into three pieces; two compatible light rail loops in Downtown Miami and South Beach to later be connected via MacArthur Causeway. This was motivated by the lengthy federal studies required for a larger project. French transport vehicle manufacturer Alstom gave an unsolicited proposal to build the Miami Beach portion of the system for US$148 million as a wireless streetcar system from 5th Street to Dade Boulevard via Washington Avenue. Alstom predicts over 20,000 riders a day just on the eight to ten stations that would be on the Miami Beach segment.

In 2019 and 2020, resort company Genting Group proposed a monorail BayLink system that would connect to a new Metromover station located at their proposed Resorts World Miami Casino project in the Omni area.

A rail connection to Miami Beach has long been desired due to its high ridership potential and lack of parking, automobile traffic, and other issues on the beach. Miami-Dade Transit's S bus route connecting downtown Miami to Collins Avenue is generally the highest ridership route in the Metrobus system. Additionally, there are several other bus routes connecting the two cities which also have high ridership. In 2012, a Metrorail spur connected Downtown Miami to Miami International Airport but without any plan to extend it to the beach.

See also
Transportation in South Florida

References

Proposed transportation infrastructure in the United States
Transportation in Miami
Transportation in Miami Beach, Florida
Transportation in Miami-Dade County, Florida